The Serie B of the Brazilian Championship 2014 is a football competition held in Brazil, equivalent to the second division. It is contested by 20 clubs, between April 18 and November 28. The top four teams will be promoted to Série A in 2015 and the last four will be relegated to Série C in 2015.

The games had a break during the 2014 FIFA World Cup, which was held between June and July in Brazil.

Teams

Stadium and locations

Number of teams by state

Personnel and kits

League table

Results

Top goalscorers

Source: CBF

References

External links
Official webpage
2014 Campeonato Brasileiro Série B at Soccerway

Campeonato Brasileiro Série B seasons
2
Brazi